The 1992 Northeast Louisiana Indians football team was an American football team that represented Northeast Louisiana University (now known as the University of Louisiana at Monroe) as part of the Southland Conference during the 1992 NCAA Division I-AA football season. In their fourth year under head coach Dave Roberts, the team compiled a 10–3 record. The Indians offense scored 466 points while the defense allowed 278 points.

Schedule

References

Northeast Louisiana
Louisiana–Monroe Warhawks football seasons
Southland Conference football champion seasons
Northeast Louisiana Indians football